Pale-Prača is a municipality located in Bosnian-Podrinje Canton Goražde of the Federation of Bosnia and Herzegovina, an entity of Bosnia and Herzegovina. The center of the municipality is Prača. According to the 2013 census, the municipality has 904 inhabitants.

Demographics

Settlements 
The municipality consists of 15 settlements with their respective populations:

 Brdarići - 20
 Brojnići - 27
 Bulozi - 6
 Čeljadinići - 48
 Čemernica - 37
 Datelji - 112
 Donja Vinča - uninhabited
 Kamenica - uninhabited
 Komrani - 20
 Prača - 304
 Renovica - 39
 Srednje - uninhabited
 Šainovići - 111
 Turkovići - 169
 Vražalice - 11

2013 census

Features
The geographical location, fertile soil, great climate, and rich forests led many people to inhabit the municipality in early times. Today many remains from the medieval times can be found in the municipality of Pale-Prača.

See also
Bosnian-Podrinje Canton Goražde
Pale

References

External links 
Official site

Municipalities of the Bosnian Podrinje Canton